Oona Orpana (born 21 January 2001) is a Finnish professional tennis player.

On the ITF Junior Circuit, she has a career-high ranking of 41, achieved on 26 February 2018.

Orpana won Finnish outdoor and indoor singles championship in 2016, and outdoor singles again in 2019 and 2021. On 29 June 2019, she won her first national doubles title (with Venla Ahti). The pair also won the national outdoor title in 2021. On national level her team is Smash-Kotka. Previously with HVS (Helsinki).

In the 2019 season, she was mainly coached by Zdenek Kubik at Prague, that was her main base in 2019. Ville-Petteri Ahti is her hitting partner/coach at Finland weeks. Her playing/training/traveling budget for 2019 was over 100,000 Euro.

In November 2019, she was awarded "Female Tennis Player of the Year" in Finland.

In autumn 2021, she moved to United States, and now represents Oklahoma State University.

Playing for the Finland Fed Cup team, Orpana has a win–loss record of 7–7.

ITF Circuit finals

Singles: 5 (1 title, 4 runner–ups)

Doubles: 9 (4 titles, 5 runner–ups)

National representation

Fed Cup
Orpana made her Fed Cup debut for Finland in 2015, while the team was competing in the Europe/Africa Zone Group II, when she was 14 years and 15 days old. This made her the youngest Fed Cup player in Finland's history.

Singles (5–5)

Doubles (2–2)

Notes

References

External links
 
 
 

2001 births
Living people
Finnish female tennis players
People from Hamina
Sportspeople from Helsinki